Konstantin Karl von Kügelgen (1810 in Volsk, Saratov Governorate – 1880 in Dorpat) was a German landscape painter and the son of Karl von Kügelgen.

Biography
His first art lessons were from his father, which he received together with his cousin, Carl Timoleon von Neff. In his youth he traveled to Italy. Later, he studied for two years in Munich, where he copied paintings from museums in the Kunstareal.

After the death of his first wife, Sally von Zezschwitz (1814–1839) he returned to the Baltics, where he worked as a drawing instructor. In 1840, he married his second wife, Alexandrine Zoege von Manteuffel (1820-1846), a distant relative of his mother. Two years after her premature death, he married into the prominent  family.

He also wrote a memoir entitled Errinerungen aus meinem Leben (Memories from my Life), which was published posthumously in Saint Petersburg.

His daughter, Sally von Kügelgen, from his third marriage, also became an artist. , a son from his second marriage, was a journalist.

Further reading
 Leo von Kügelgen: Gerhard von Kügelgen. Ein Malerleben um 1800 und die anderen sieben Künstler der Familie. Stuttgart 1924

References

External links
 
 History of the Kügelgen family (In German)

1810 births
1880 deaths
People from Volsk
People from Volsky Uyezd
Baltic-German people
19th-century German painters
19th-century German male artists
German male painters